William Lattimore (February 9, 1774 – April 3, 1843) was Delegate to the United States House of Representatives from Mississippi Territory.

Biography

Early life
William Lattimore was born in Norfolk, Virginia on February 9, 1774. He attended the common schools, where he studied medicine.

Career
He moved to Natchez, Mississippi Territory, and practiced his profession. When the Mississippi Territory was formed in 1798, he took an active part in the organization of the government. 

He was elected as a Delegate to the 8th and 9th Congresses that lasted from March 4, 1803 to March 3, 1807. He was also elected to the 13th and 14th Congresses (March 4, 1813 – March 3, 1817) as well. 

He was a delegate to the first State constitutional convention of Mississippi in 1817, appointed a censor of the medical profession under the constitution and code, and one of the commissioners to select the site for the seat of the new State government.

Death
He died in Natchez, Mississippi on April 3, 1843.

See also

8th United States Congress
9th United States Congress
13th United States Congress
14th United States Congress
Mississippi Territory
United States House of Representatives

References
William Lattimore

|-

1774 births
1843 deaths
Delegates to the United States House of Representatives from Mississippi Territory
Mississippi Democratic-Republicans
Politicians from Norfolk, Virginia